John Higgins (born 1975) is a Scottish snooker player.

John Higgins may also refer to:

Politics
 John Higgins (Australian politician) (1884–1936), New South Wales politician
 John Gilbert Higgins (1891–1963), Newfoundland politician
 John Patrick Higgins (1893–1955), U.S. Representative from Massachusetts

Sports
 John Higgins (cricketer) (1885–1970), English cricketer
 John Higgins (swimmer) (1916–2004), American swimmer and swimming coach
 John Higgins (footballer, born 1930) (1930–2017), Scottish footballer (Hibernian, St Mirren, Swindon Town)
 John Higgins (footballer, born 1932) (1932–2005), English footballer (Bolton)
 John Higgins (footballer, born 1933) (1933–1994), Scottish footballer (Celtic)
 John Higgins (bowls) (1940–2012), Irish lawn and indoor bowler
 John Higgins (Gaelic footballer) (born 1963), Irish Gaelic footballer (Kerry)
 Johnnie Lee Higgins (born 1983), American football wide receiver for the Oakland Raiders

Entertainment
 John C. Higgins (1908–1995), American screenwriter
 Jon B. Higgins (1939–1984), American musician who specialized in Carnatic music
 John Higgins (comics) (born 1949), English comic book artist and writer
 John Michael Higgins (born 1963), American actor and voice actor
 John Higgins, American comedian and comedy writer; member of Please Don't Destroy

Other
 John Higgins (poet) (c. 1544 – by 1620), English cleric, poet and linguist
 John Higgins (gunman) (1848–1914), cowboy of the Old West
 John Michael Higgins (businessman) (1862–1937), Australian businessman and metallurgist
 John Woodman Higgins (1874–1961), American steel businessman, armory museum founder
 John Higgins (admiral) (1899–1973), U.S. Navy rear admiral
 John Seville Higgins (1904–1992), bishop of the Episcopal Diocese of Rhode Island
 John M. Higgins (1961–2006), American reporter and editor specializing in the cable television industry
 John Higgins (Newcastle town crier), town crier, on whom the character Johnny Luik-up is based
 Sir John Higgins of Montoge, Irish physician

See also
 John Higgin, rugby league footballer of the 1930s and 1940s for Barrow
 Jonathan Higgins, a character in Magnum, P.I. played by John Hillerman
 Jack Higgins (disambiguation)